Glenville High School is a public high school in the Glenville area on the East Side of Cleveland, Ohio.  The school is part of the Cleveland Metropolitan School District. The school originally resided at the former Oliver Wendell Holmes school (then The Doan Building) which formerly sat on the northeast corner of E. 105th and St. Clair then later moved to Parkwood and Everton in October 1904 as population grew. The current building was built in 1964 and is located at E. 113th and St. Clair.

Community
The Village of Glenville was incorporated in 1870, and was annexed by the City of Cleveland in 1904. Glenville was known for its farmlands, glens of trees and summer leisuring for the wealthy during its early years. Having been initially settled by northern European immigrants, by the end of the World War I, the demographic began to shift with an influx of Jews. By the Great Depression, the Glenville neighborhood had become the epicenter of Cleveland's Jewish population, with the high school reflecting the change. 
Glenville's population remained in flux, with the demographic changing considerably since World War II. By the 1950s, the neighborhood was predominantly African-American, with the school's enrollment reflecting the shift accordingly.

Superman

Jerry Siegel (October 17, 1914 – January 28, 1996) and Joe Shuster (July 10, 1914 - July 30, 1992), co-creators of the DC Comics character Superman, both attended Glenville, with  Siegel working for the weekly student newspaper, The Torch in which he published the Tarzan parody, Goober the Mighty. Siegel and Shuster together also published what may have been the first SF fanzine, Cosmic Stories. Superman has since gone on to become one of the most recognized fictional characters of modern times.

Athletics
The school's athletic teams are called the Tarblooders. The school is most notable for its football team and track teams, both coached by Ted Ginn Sr.  During the 2006 college football season, Glenville had seven of its graduates on the Ohio State Buckeyes football roster alone.  Several of those players were also members of the track and field team, which won five consecutive Ohio High School State Championships.

In November 2009, Glenville's football team beat regional powerhouse Massillon to  become the first Cleveland Public school to advance to the State Final in OHSAA Playoff history.

In 2022, Glenville won their first OHSAA football state championship, becoming the first Cleveland Public school to win a state championship.

Ohio High School Athletic Association State Championships

 Football - 2022
 Boys Track - 1959, 1960, 1965, 1966, 1967, 1968, 1970, 1973, 1974, 1975, 2003, 2004, 2005, 2006, 2007, 2014, 2022 

Robert Ware:
"Bullet" Bobby Ware was inducted into the OHIO ASSOCIATION OF TRACK & CROSS COUNTRY COACHES HALL OF FAME in 2002.   Robert Ware, is arguably the greatest sprinter ever to attend the storied Cleveland Glenville High School where he won multiple State Meet Titles in relays, 100 and 220 yard dashes. His record-setting teams also won three championships in the 880 yard relay and three State Meet Titles in the same years of 1966, 1967, and 1968. Robert participated at Cuyahoga Community College and Western Kentucky University. Robert ran in the 1972 Olympic Trials. He also competed with the Philadelphia Pioneer Track Club when he ran the fastest time in the world as a member of the 400 meter relay in 1972.

Notable alumni

 Gordon Allport – Psychologist
 H. Leslie Adams – Composer
 Leon Bibb – TV news anchor
 Richard Bishop – NFL player
 Marvin Bower – Business theorist
 Bryant Browning - NFL player
 Christian Bryant – NFL player
 Coby Bryant - NFL player
 Frank Clark – NFL player
 Davon Coleman – NFL player
 Jayrone Elliott – NFL player
 Donnie Fletcher - NFL Player
 Benny Friedman (1905–1982), Hall of Fame NFL football quarterback
 Willie Gilbert – Playwright
 Ted Ginn Jr. – NFL player
 Maurice Goldman (1910–1984) – Composer, conductor. 
 Mark Gunn – NFL player
 Justin Hardee – NFL player
 Steve Harvey – Actor, comedian
 Willie Henry – NFL player
 Jermale Hines – NFL player
 Wilson Hirschfeld – Journalist
 Ross Hunter – Film producer
 Cardale Jones - NFL Player
 Marshon Lattimore – NFL player
 Jerome Lawrence – Playwright
 Al Lerner – Pianist, composer
 Hal Lebovitz – Sportswriter, columnist
 Ruby Grant Martin – Lawyer, federal civil rights official
 Howard Metzenbaum – U.S. Senator
 Antwaun Molden – NFL player
 Jonathan Newsome – NFL player
 Ron O'Neal – Actor
 Max Ratner – Real estate developer
 Devine Redding – NFL player
 Michael Shane – Lawyer, actor
 Joe Shuster – Co–creator of the comic book hero Superman
 Jerry Siegel – Co–creator of the comic book hero Superman.
 Patricia Haynes Smith – Member, Louisiana House of Representatives
 Troy Smith – Heisman Trophy winner, NFL player
 Ray Solomonoff – Founder of Artificial Intelligence
 Jack Weston – Actor 
 Michael R. White – Mayor, Cleveland
 Donte Whitner – NFL player
 Lindsey Witten NFL player
 Pierre Woods – NFL player
 Chris Worley - NFL player
 Shane Wynn – NFL player
 Curtis Young - NFL player

References

External links
 Cleveland Metropolitan School District
 Glenville High School yearbooks available on Cleveland Public Library Digital Gallery, various years 1906 through 1986

Education in Cleveland
High schools in Cuyahoga County, Ohio
Public high schools in Ohio
Glenville, Cleveland
1892 establishments in Ohio
Educational institutions established in 1892
Cleveland Metropolitan School District
School buildings completed in 1964